Carruthers, sometimes Caruthers, is a Scottish surname and clan, originating from the lands of Carruthers in Dumfriesshire.

The place name is derived from the Cumbric elements caer ("fort") and Rhydderch (a personal name perhaps meaning "red ruler"), and so meaning "Rhydderch's fort", possibly in reference to Riderch I of Alt Clut.

As of 19 August 2019, Dr Simon Peter Carruthers of Holmains, 22nd of his line, was confirmed as Chief of the Name and Arms of Carruthers by the Lord Lyon King of Arms in Edinburgh, Scotland. 

The family and clan are represented internationally by the Clan Carruthers Society (International)(CCS(I)); its website is www.clancarrutherssociety.org. The Society was founded in January 2017 and is officially recognised by the Chief of Carruthers as representing the worldwide Carruthers family and the home of his clan. It has regional representatives in Africa, Australia, Canada, Europe, U.K. and the US. CCS(I) is non-commercial, apolitical and non-partisan and is open to any member of the international Carruthers family and derivatives of that name. 

The Society is based in the United Kingdom, but is represented by an international Executive Council made up of senior members from the regions.

In Louisiana, Carruthers has evolved into Credeur, a gallicized form of the name; it is a common surname today in the southern part of the state.

Notable people with the surname 
Bob Caruthers, American Major League Baseball player
Chris Carruthers (born 1983), English footballer
David Carruthers (born 1957), British businessman
David Carruthers, Canadian curler
Sir David Carruthers, New Zealand judge
Douglas Carruthers (1882–1962), soldier, explorer, and naturalist
Elizabeth Carruthers (born 1951), Canadian diver
George Carruthers (born 1953), Convenor, Clan Carruthers Society 
George Robert Carruthers (born 1939), American physicist and inventor
Ian Carruthers, British National Health Service manager
Jimmy Carruthers (1929–1990), Australian world champion boxer
John Carruthers (footballer) (1900–1959), English footballer
John Valentine Carruthers (born 1958), English musician, Siouxsie and the Banshees
Joseph Carruthers (1857–1932), Premier of New South Wales 1904 to 1907
Kel Carruthers (born 1938), Australian former world champion Grand Prix 
Kitty Carruthers (born 1961), American pairs figure skater
Mark Carruthers (born 1965), British talk show host on BBC
Pamela Carruthers (1916–2009), British showjumping course designer
Perry Carruthers (1952-2022), American Farmer and Rancher, 
Peter Carruthers (philosopher) (born 1952), British philosopher
Peter Carruthers (figure skater) (born 1959), American pairs figure skater
Peter A. Carruthers (1935–1997), American physicist
Reid Carruthers (born 1984), Canadian curler
Robert Carruthers (1799–1878), Scottish journalist and writer
Robert L. Caruthers (1800–1882), American politician and judge, governor of Tennessee
Samir Carruthers (born 1993), Irish footballer
Scatman Caothers, American actor and musician
Steffi Carruthers (born 1993), Samoan tennis player
Stuart Carruthers (born 1970 ) Australian field hockey player
Thomas N. Carruthers (1900–1960), Episcopal bishop of South Carolina
Thomas Caruthers (c. 1818–1867), Texas politician
Troy Carruthers (born 1982), Nebraska - Farm Bureau - Wealth Manger - Rancher  
Wallace Bruce Matthews Carruthers (1863–1910), Canadian soldier and founder of the Canadian Signal Corps
William Carruthers (1830–1922), British botanist 
Will Carruthers (born 1967), alternative rock musician

Fictional characters
Carruthers, protagonist of Robert Erskine Childers's novel Riddle of the Sands
Bob Carruthers, a character from the Sherlock Holmes story The Adventure of the Solitary Cyclist
Elizabeth and Peter Carruthers, a married couple; she inherits his trading firm, Carruthers & Co., in the 2016 Discovery Channel/Netflix series Frontier
Georgie Carruthers, protagonist of Ruby Dixon novel Ice Planet Barbarians

See also
Carruthers Field, American military airbase at Benbrook, Texas, near Fort Worth, during World War I
Clan Carruthers, a Border Reiver Clan and Family originating in the West March of the Anglo-Scottish Borders, Annandale, Dumfriesshire.

References

Surnames of Scottish origin